{{DISPLAYTITLE:C6H8O3}}
The molecular formula C6H8O3 (molar mass: 128.13 g/mol, exact mass: 128.0473 u) may refer to:

 2,5-Bis(hydroxymethyl)furan
 Dihydrolevoglucosenone
 Dihydrophloroglucinol
 Furaneol
 HOCPCA
 Sotolon